The City Council elections for the City of Preston, Lancashire were held on 4 May 2006 on the same day as other 2006 United Kingdom local elections. Nineteen electoral wards were fought. The only change was that Labour gained one seat from the Liberal Democrats, continuing to be the largest party, but the Council remained under no overall control

Candidates

The number of candidates fielded, by party, were:

 Labour - 19
 Conservative - 19
 Liberal Democrats - 18
 BNP - 1
 Respect Party - 5
 Green Party - 3

Summary results

New composition

As of May 2006, Labour have 24 councillors, Conservative 17, LibDems 12, Respect 2 and there are two Independent councillors. Preston City Council remains under no overall control.

Ward results

Preston Council is elected in thirds, which means there is an all out election in one year followed by single-member elections in all three-member wards and selected two-member wards. All changes in percentage share of the vote are from the corresponding 2003 or 2004 elections in the respective wards. Any "gain" or "loss" compares this year's elections with the 2002 "all out"  vote because the councilors in this election are defending that year's result.

Brookfield
In the north east of the city, the predominantly low income housing of Brookfield is a three-member ward. Buttressed up against Ribbleton and the rural east, and wedge-shaped to the south of Fulwood, the ward has been troubled by increasing levels of crime in recent years. Parts of the ward were formerly within the Fulwood district council and maintain the look of the affluent northern quarters of the city.

Cadley
The central ward of Cadley is positioned between Fulwood and Preston, with the main Lytham Road and Cadley Causeway used as the boundary between it and the nearby College and Ashton wards. Cadley is almost entirely suburban housing with a heavy commuter population.

College
Created in the last round of local boundary reviews, the two-member College ward centres on two Fulwood employers. Preston College has a catchment area far beyond the city itself, whilst the recently closed Sharoe Green hospital has had many of its services re-directed to the Royal Preston Hospital. There are a mix of commuter and student housing and an increasing Muslim population.

The last election for a councillor in College ward was in 2003; the change of vote in this table is based on the 2003 figures.

Fishwick
Fishwick is a ward in the southwest of the city, at the border with South Ribble, spreading north into Ribbleton. The ward has a sizable percentage of comfortable housing but has in recent years been more infamous for the troubled Callon housing estate. The ward has higher than average unemployment and continuing issues with crime and drugs. In the 2004 elections, for the first time since local government restructuring in the 1970s, Fishwick elected a Conservative candidate to Town Hall. This accounts for the large changes in vote in this results table.
  

Councillor Harold Parker resigned due to health issues in August 2009 triggering a by-election on 1 October which was won by the Labour Party's Jennifer Mein.

Garrison
Centred on Fulwood Barracks, this is a three-member ward created by the last round of boundary reviews. It is set in a heavily small "c" conservative part of Preston with a number of schools and small employment centres. In April 2006 Marie Milne changed party from Conservative to Liberal Democrat.

Greyfriars
Its name coming from a large private estate within its boundaries, Greyfriars is one of the oldest names connected to Preston's history. It includes the Pius X Preparatory school and Fulwood's leisure centre. An increasing number of comfortable suburban houses has been built on the fringes of the ward, which also borders Ingol Golf Course.

Ingol
Ingol ward is in the north west of the city, bordered by Greyfriars and to the south of the M55 motorway. The ward contains two main population areas, Ingol and Tanterton. The latter has had problems with drugs and crime over recent years but this is beginning to improve. Parts of the ward are comfortable with some commuter areas and houses neighbouring the Lancaster canal. There are still pockets of troubled communities.

Ingol is a three-member ward. Two councillors were elected in 2003 following the expulsion from Town Hall of a Liberal Democrat councillor.

Larches
In the west of the city, around 30 minutes from the city centre, Larches is a box-shaped ward from the Riversway dual-carriageway into Blackpool to Haslam Park. It contains two post-war housing estates, Larches and Savick, and an area of suburban sprawl moved in from Ashton following boundary changes. The ward contains the whole of Ashton Park.

Lea
The three member ward of Lea contains the small Fylde border town of Lea Town, the urban Lea community and the sprawling green-belt community of Cottam. The ward mirrors the parish council boundary of Lea and Cottam Parish Council. Cottam has grown from a small farming community to a large private housing development populated by young families and business people.

Moor Park
Based on the Plungington community and bordering both the neat suburban terraces of southern Fulwood and the University of Central Lancashire campus, the Moor Park ward has a high number of student housing in converted Victorian housing and neater family houses. The Plungington area is split between this ward and neighbouring Tulketh. Moor Park itself is included in this ward, in the shadow of Deepdale football stadium.

Preston Rural North
Over reaching across the city of Preston is the large Preston Rural North ward, which includes the M6 and M55 motorways and acres of market towns, farming communities and rural areas. The boroughs of Fylde and Wyre border this northern ward, which is a three-member ward.

In 2003, there was no election in this ward as the sitting councillor was unopposed.

Ribbleton
Ribbleton, in the east of the city, grew massively in population as council housing was built around former mill worker terraces; now the ward is one of the largest in population and shows all the usual issues of high level crime and deprivation. Ribbleton, in common with the neighbouring Brookfield ward, is overwhelmingly white working class.

Riversway
The Riversway ward has three distinct elements. Broadgate, a comfortable estate of Victorian housing with a high percentage of student housing; new  build housing on the former British Aerospace site; and the redeveloped marina. The former Preston Port, one of the largest in its time, has been redeveloped to feature shopping units and new build housing of some considerable expense. The Preston Docks and surrounding area has a sizable area of Development including new Supermarkets, Car dealers and trade outlets.

A Hindu temple, Lancashire County Council's headquarters and Preston's railway station are in the Riversway ward.

Sharoe Green
Lodged in the south-central area of Fulwood, the Sharoe Green ward is based on the former hospital and surrounding commuter belt environs.

St George's
The St George's ward is a rectangle-shaped ward in between Deepdale and the city centre. The largest area of population are rows of old-style terraces with streets named after various saints - David, Barnabus, Anne, Martin, Michael and George to name a few. The ward has one of the largest percentage of Hindu and Muslim population in the city and has an increasing student population.

St Matthew's
A wedge-shaped ward in between the streets of Ribbleton and the city centre, this ward contains some deprived housing in the process of renewal, and in the recent months expensive new-build conversions.

Town Centre
Formed by boundary changes prior to Preston being awarded city status, Town Centre is the largest non-rural ward in the borough. There are three distinct parts to this central seat, namely Avenham, Frenchwood and the city centre itself.

The ward includes student developments and converted student homes in Avenham; expensive new build developments around the historic Winckley Square; and the Frenchwood area on the banks of the River Ribble. Avenham was notorious for high levels of crime and deprivation, but this is turning around with the establishment of community groups and private housing associations funding renewal. There is a sizable Muslim population in Avenham and Frenchwood.

Tulketh
Tulketh ward is a central and entirely urban ward north of the University complex, and to the east of Ashton. Its main population areas are traditional terrace housing, which mixes families with small shops including the Lane Ends shopping village and student housing.

Cllr Al-Serraj died in 2007. The resulting by-election was held the following year, resulting in a hold for the defending Labour Party.

University
Shaped around the outskirts of the city centre, this butterfly-wing shaped ward was formed following the recent boundary changes. It took from the oversized Riversway ward electors from the St Pauls and Maudland areas as well as the University campus itself. It is a two-member ward.

The last election for University ward was held in 2003. The changes in vote are from the election in this year.

See also
Preston local elections
City of Preston, Lancashire
Fulwood, Lancashire
Preston (UK Parliament constituency)

References

2006 Preston election result
Ward results

2006 English local elections
2006
2000s in Lancashire